Nemaha Township is one of twenty-four townships in Gage County, Nebraska, United States. The population was 366 at the 2000 census. A 2006 estimate placed the township's population at 369.

References

External links
City-Data.com

Townships in Gage County, Nebraska
Townships in Nebraska